Philip Shanahan (27 October 1874 – 21 November 1931) was an Irish Sinn Féin politician, who was elected to the United Kingdom House of Commons in 1918 and served as a Teachta Dála (TD) in Dáil Éireann from 1919 to 1922.

He lived in Dublin, where he was a licensed vintner, maintaining a premises in the notorious Monto area.

He was involved in the Easter Rising in Dublin in 1916. This led to him having legal difficulties over the licence of his public house. Shanahan consulted the lawyer and politician Tim Healy who commented:

"I had with me to-day a solicitor with his client, a Dublin publican named Phil Shanahan, whose licence is being opposed, and whose house was closed by the military because he was in Jacob's during Easter week. I was astonished at the type of man - about 40 years of age, jolly and respectable. He said he "rose out" to have a "crack at the English" and seemed not at all concerned at the question of success or failure. He was a Tipperary hurler in the old days. For such a man to join the Rebellion and sacrifice the splendid trade he enjoyed makes one think there are disinterested Nationalists to be found. I thought a publican was the last man in the world to join a rising! Alfred Byrne, M.P., was with him, and is bitter against the Party. I think I can save Shanahan's property."

He was elected for Dublin Harbour at the 1918 general election, defeating Alfie Byrne. Like other Sinn Féin MPs he did not take his seat at Westminster, but became a member of the revolutionary Dáil. He represented Dublin Harbour in the First Dáil 1919 to 1921. He was arrested and detained in custody by the British government in April 1920 but was released in time to attend the next meeting of the Dáil on 29 June 1920.

In 1921 a general election was held for the House of Commons of Southern Ireland. Republicans used this as an election for the Second Dáil. Shanahan was elected unopposed for the four member Dublin Mid constituency. He was defeated at the 1922 general election to the Third Dáil, as a member of the Anti-Treaty faction of Sinn Féin (which opposed the creation of the Irish Free State in the place of the Republic declared in 1919).

He left Dublin in 1928 and returned to his home village of Hollyford, County Tipperary. He died on 21 November 1931, aged 57.

References

Sources
 Who's Who of British Members of Parliament: Vol. III 1919-1945, edited by M. Stenton & S. Lees (The Harvester Press 1979)
 Parliamentary Election Results in Ireland 1801-1922, edited by B.M. Walker (Royal Irish Academy 1978)

Early Sinn Féin TDs
Members of the 1st Dáil
Members of the 2nd Dáil
Members of the Parliament of the United Kingdom for County Dublin constituencies (1801–1922)
Politicians from County Tipperary
UK MPs 1918–1922
1874 births
1931 deaths